Riverside is the western terminus of the MBTA Green Line D branch (Highland branch) light rail line. It is located at 333 Grove Street, off Exit 38 on Interstate 95 (Route 128), in Auburndale, a village of Newton, Massachusetts. Riverside includes a parking lot with spaces for 925 automobiles and bicycle parking. West of the station is Riverside Yard, the main maintenance facility and largest storage yard for the Green Line. The station is fully accessible.

Riverside station is home to a scale model of the dwarf planet Pluto in the Boston Museum of Science's community-wide solar system model.

History

Through 1958, when the Highland branch was served by the New York Central's Boston and Albany Railroad, Riverside station was at the junction between the Highland branch and the B&A main line (now the Framingham/Worcester Line). The MTA built a large commuter parking lot with a new brick station at the center and opened the branch to streetcar service on July 4, 1959. In 1995, new elevated platforms were built at the north end of the yard and the 1959-built station used as a bus terminal. The 1995-built platforms were raised slightly above track level; these made the station handicapped accessible when low-floor trolleys arrived in 2002. 

Riverside is the only surface-level Green Line station with a prepayment (fare controlled) platform area. This allows passengers to board at all doors. Fare control began during morning peak hours only when the current platforms opened in 1995, and full-time in 2006 when the CharlieCard fare card system was introduced.

A track connection still exists with the main line; catenary is installed up to the junction for offloading trolleys delivered by the railroad onto the light rail network. From October 23 to 25, a commuter rail shuttle was run from a temporary platform at Riverside to South Station using the old track connection.

In 2014, the state announced plans Riverside would be the terminus of a proposed DMU Indigo Line to South Station, via the former track connection, but the plans were cancelled in 2015. A private group plans to restore the pedestrian underpass at the former mainline station as part of a trail network in the area. The state awarded $100,000 in design funding in 2019. Riverside Yard will be modified in the late 2020s to support new Type 10 LRVs.

Development
The MBTA began planning for transit-oriented development at Riverside by the 1980s. In October 1997, Riverside was identified as a possible site for a parking garage, but this was not pursued. On February 12, 2009, the MBTA authorized an 85-year lease of a portion of the Riverside parking lots for a mixed-use development. As originally planned, this development was to contain  of office space,  of retail space, and 190 residential units. In late 2019, the city rezoned the site to allow for a larger development. The station will be modified with two elevators, new ramps, and a new canopy structure. A parcel at the southwest end of the yard, originally to be used for the development, will be retained by the MBTA for yard expansion beginning around 2024.

Station layout

Bus connections
MBTA bus route  runs to Newton Corner from Riverside; the route previously ran as a partial express to downtown Boston. The 500 (discontinued) and 555 (cut back to Central Square, Waltham as the ) routes formerly ran to Riverside as well.

Intercity bus services to and from Boston, including Greyhound Lines, Peter Pan Bus Lines, Go Buses, and Megabus, offer occasional stops at Riverside. This service was temporarily suspended in early 2010, but was reinstated that October.

References

External links

MBTA - Riverside

Green Line (MBTA) stations
Railway stations in Middlesex County, Massachusetts
Former Boston and Albany Railroad stations
Bus stations in Middlesex County, Massachusetts
Railway stations in the United States opened in 1959